Hanging Houghton is a small village in West Northamptonshire in England. It is on the A508 road between Brixworth and Lamport, in the civil parish of Lamport.

The villages name means 'Houghton (= hill-spur farm/settlement) on a steep slope'.

Great house and gardens
Hanging Houghton was the location of a great house and gardens, which although no longer present is listed as a scheduled monument as part of the Ancient Monuments and Archaeological Areas Act 1979.  This monument encompasses the now buried and the earthwork remains of the house and gardens, and is in the south west area of the village.

From 1471 until it was abandoned in 1665 the house was owned by the Montague family. It is shown on a map in 1655 as having highly elaborate formal gardens including a knot garden and several terraced walks. The ruins of the house survived into the late 18th century, but all that now remains is a rectangular building platform measuring 40 metres by 30 metres in the north east corner of the land.  Contemporary illustrations suggest the house was of typical late-16th-century design with three bays and a symmetrical south elevation with central porch. Nothing of the gardens remain other than a series of rectangular areas noticeable by shallow banks and earthworks measuring less than 1 metre in height.

Listed buildings
The village is home to five Grade II listed buildings:
A K6 telephone box on Manor Road
The Hanging Houghton School House
Clint Hill Farmhouse
Manor Farmhouse
Numbers 18,19 and 20 Manor Road

The Domesday Book
Hanging Houghton was referenced as a settlement in the Domesday Book of 1086.  It was recorded as having a population of 30 households.  The book recorded the households, owners, resources and land value as follows:

References

External links 

Villages in Northamptonshire
West Northamptonshire District